Chad Hatfield (born December 15, 1953) is an Eastern Orthodox archpriest. He is currently the president of St. Vladimir's Orthodox Seminary, where he teaches missiology and evangelism courses. He is also the editor of the Orthodox Christian Profiles series, published by St. Vladimir’s Seminary Press.

Biography 
Hatfield was ordained to the diaconate (January 5, 1994) and the priesthood (January 6, 1994) by Bishop Basil of Wichita (Antiochian Orthodox Christian Archdiocese of North America). Between 2002 and 2007 he served as the dean of St. Herman Seminary in Alaska. On November 18, 2006, he was elected chancellor of St. Vladimir's Orthodox Seminary and began his term on September 8, 2007. Ten year later, he was appointed chief executive officer. A few months later, he was appointed president of the institute.

He is married to Matushka Thekla. She is the coordinator for the St. Juliana Society. An iconographer and graphic designer, she is currently finishing her certification as a botanical illustrator. They have two sons and three grandchildren.

Education 
 1975 - B.A., Southwestern College
 1978 - M.Div., Nashotah House
 1988 - S.T.M., Nashotah House. Thesis: "Baptism, Chrismation, Eucharist: Christian Initiation, A Recovery of the Primitive Pattern"
 2001 - D.Min., Pittsburgh Theological Seminary. Thesis: "An Examination of the Pastoral Rites for Ministry to the Sick as Found in the Orthodox Christian Euchologia"
 2015 - Certificate in Fund Raising Management from Indiana University School of Philanthropy, 2015

Pastoral experience 
 1978-1993 – 16 years of ministry in the Episcopal Church as parish priest, school chaplain, missionary in South Africa and as cathedral dean
 1994-2002 – Founding Pastor of All Saints Orthodox Church, Salina, Kansas
 1999-2002 –  Priest-in-charge, St. Mary Magdalene Orthodox Mission, Manhattan, Kansas

Publications 
Although Hatfield's activity focuses on administrative work, he is also editor of the Orthodox Christian Profiles and the Mission and Evangelism series, and author of several publications.

Selected publications include:

 From Masks to Icons – Center for Ethics and Religion, University of Notre Dame, 2004
 Seminarians and Substance Abuse Training – National Center on Addiction and Substance Abuse, Columbia University, 2005
 Models for American Orthodox Missiology, Orthodox Education Day, SVS, 2007
 Banquet Keynote – Dedication of the new OCMC Center, FL, 2009
 Speaker at “Europe & the Judeo-Christian Tradition”, Vienna, Austria, 2010
 Bishop Grafton & St. Tikhon, Fellowship of Ss. Alban & Sergius Celebration of the 20th Anniversary of the Glorification of St. Tikhon, Nashotah House
 Speaker, National Religious Freedom Conference, Washington, D.C., 2012
 Guest Lecturer in Missiology, Kiev Academy, Ukraine, 2013
 Anglican/Orthodox Dialogue, Annual Kuhner, Reformed Episcopal Seminary, Blue Bell, Pa, 2014
 Orthodoxy & The Seventh Ecumenical Council, Anglo-Catholic Congress, Fort Worth, TX, 2015
 Marriage & Theosis, World Congress of Families, Salt Lake City, UT, November 2015
 Legacy of St. Vladimir’s Seminary, 1000th Anniversary Celebration of the Repose of St. Vladimir, Moscow, Russia, 2015
 Lessons from Contemporary Orthodox Missiology, Romanian Youth Worker Symposium, Fordham University, 16 April 2016
 Marriage as a Pathway to Theosis, "Walk Through the Door of Holiness: An Ecumenical Conference Exploring Christian Character within Post-Christian Culture,” Greenwich, NY

References

Living people
American Eastern Orthodox clergy
1953 births